Monnechroma subpulvereum is a species of beetle in the family Cerambycidae. It was described by Martin Schmidt in 1924, who named it Callichroma (Xenochroma) subpulvereum, designating it to be the type species of the subgenus Xenochroma, subsequently found to be an invalid. It is known from southeastern Brazil.

References

Callichromatini
Beetles described in 1924
Endemic fauna of Brazil